The 2019 European Parliament election in Italy took place in Italy on 26 May 2019.

In Friuli-Venezia Giulia Lega Nord came first with 42.6% of the vote (country-level result 34.3%) and more than 20pp than the Democratic Party, which came second with 22.2%. The Five Star Movement came third with 9.6%, ahead of Brothers of Italy (7.6%), Forza Italia (6.7%), More Europe (3.0%), Green Europe (3.0%) and The Left (1.6%). The South Tyrolean People's Party, which included one candidate from the Slovene Union, reached 38.9% in San Floriano del Collio.

Results

References

Elections in Friuli-Venezia Giulia
European Parliament elections in Italy
2019 European Parliament election
2019 elections in Italy